The following highways are numbered 715:

Costa Rica
 National Route 715

United States
Florida
  Florida State Road 715
  Pennsylvania Route 715

Territories
  Puerto Rico Highway 715